Te Mahoe is a rural settlement in the Whakatāne District and Bay of Plenty Region of New Zealand's North Island, next to Lake Matahina.

The community consists of about 150 people, including 30 families in the village at the base of the Lake Matahina Dam. Locals describe the community has close-knit and centred around the local school.

History

Hone Tuwhare

Poet Hone Tuwhare lived in Te Mahoe during the 1950s and 1960s with his wife, writer Jean McCormack, and their three sons. He worked as a boiler-maker on the construction of the Matahina hydroelectric dam.

In 1962, the Whakatane Beacon newspaper published one of Tuwhare's poems. It began:

Up at the dam site, at Te Mahoe,among the clatter of pneumatic drills,the settling dust and the raw earth,a man is writing poetry.

His first book was published two years later, in 1964, to immediate critical acclaim.

Cyclone Cook

The area was affected by Cyclone Cook in April 2017. The school was closed for several days. A boil water notice was issued for residents due to sediment from floodwaters contaminating water supplies.

Education

References

Whakatane District
Populated places in the Bay of Plenty Region